Boromura (officially Hathai Kotor) is the name of the centrally located hill range in Tripura. It is situated mainly in West Tripura and South Tripura districts.

Many rivers originate from this hill range e.g. the Saidra and Sumli river that flows to Bangladesh.

Hills of Tripura